The Botanical Garden of the University of Vienna is a botanical garden in Vienna, Austria. It covers 8 hectares and is immediately adjacent to the Belvedere gardens. It is a part of the University of Vienna.

The gardens date back to 1754 when Empress Maria Theresa founded the Hortus Botanicus Vindobonensis with renowned botanist Nikolaus von Jacquin as one of its first directors. His son, Joseph von Jacquin, succeeded him as director, as did a number of other leading botanists in turn, including Stefan Endlicher, Eduard Fenzl, Anton Kerner von Marilaun, Richard von Wettstein, Fritz Knoll, Karl von Frisch, and Lothar Geitler. The Institute of Botany building was opened in 1905. However, at the end of the Second World War, the institute, all the greenhouses, and the entire garden area were bombed and severely damaged, and thus required major repair work.

The gardens currently contain more than 11,500 species of plants, including well-documented tropical plants, particularly of such families as Annonaceae, Rubiaceae, Gesneriaceae, Bromeliaceae or Orchidaceae. Its greenhouses (ca. 1,500m²) were originally built between 1890 and 1893, but were damaged during the Second World War; they were renovated or rebuilt between 1970 and 1995. Only the tropical greenhouse in the centre of the complex is open for the public.

The garden collections include:

Abies pinsapo
Aesculus pavia
Asimina triloba
Cephalotaxus harringtonia
Diospyros lotus
Elaeagnus angustifolia
Ephedra
Ficus carica
Ginkgo biloba
Gunnera chilensis
+Laburnocytisus adamii
Liriodendron tulipifera
Magnolia
Metasequoia glyptostroboides
 
Nothofagus antarctica
Ostrya carpinifolia
Paeonia
Parrotia persica
Paulownia tomentosa
Phyllostachys viridiglaucescens
Pinus aristata
Platanus orientalis
Poncirus trifoliata
Prunus tenella
Rhododendron
Salvia
Sequoiadendron giganteum
Syringa
Viburnum
Vitis riparia

References

External links 
 The garden's website (in English)

Tourist attractions in Vienna
Landstraße
University of Vienna
University of Vienna
Parks in Vienna
1754 establishments in Austria